Shenberrow Hill is a prominent hill in the Cotswolds hill range in the county of Gloucestershire and, at , is the third highest point in the county.

Location 
Shenberrow Hill rises on the northwestern edge of the Cotswolds about 5 kilometres south-southwest of the village of Broadway and about 1,200 metres west-southwest of the hamlet of Snowshill. The summit is open and there is a site of an Iron Age hillfort - Shenberrow Hill Camp - on the hillside to the northwest about 300 metres from the top. There is a trig point at 298 metres on the southern spur of the hill about 600 metres from the summit. To the west the ground slopes steeply downhill through partially wooded hillsides to the Vale of Evesham, while to the east it descends briefly before rising again at Oat Hill (c. 272 m) just outside Snowshill.

The county boundary between Gloucestershire and Worcestershire lies about 2 kilometres northeast of Shenberrow Hill.

The actual summit is featureless and lies within an open field.

See also
List of hills of Gloucestershire

References

External links
 Shenberrow Hillfort at www.pastscape.org.uk.
 Plate 39: Stanton, Shenberrow Hill-fort at www.british-history.ac.uk.

Hills of Gloucestershire
Cotswolds